Events in the year 1970 in Portugal.

Incumbents
President: Américo Tomás
Prime Minister: Marcelo Caetano

Events

22 November – Operation Green Sea, an attack on Conakry, the capital of Guinea

Undated
Operation Gordian Knot, a military campaign in Portuguese Mozambique, part of the Portuguese Colonial War (1961–1974).
The Portuguese Workers' Communist Party, a Maoist political party, founded

Arts and entertainment

Sports

Births

Deaths
26 April – Francisco Cunha Leal, politician (born 1888)
3 June – Aníbal Milhais, the most decorated Portuguese soldier of World War I (born 1895).
27 July – António de Oliveira Salazar, professor and politician (born 1889)
22 November – Casimiro de Oliveira, racing driver (born 1907)

References

 
1970s in Portugal
1970 in Europe
Years of the 20th century in Portugal
Portugal